Britton is a given name. Notable people with the name include:

Britton Chance (1913–2010), professor of biochemistry and biophysics
Britton Chance, Jr. (1940–2012), American naval architect yacht designer
Britton Colquitt (born 1985), National Football League punter
Britton Johnsen (born 1979), American basketball player
Britton Keeshan (born 1981), American mountain climber
Britton Rice (born 1981), American musician